James Emott (March 9, 1771 – April 7, 1850) was an American lawyer and politician from New York.

Life
He studied law, was admitted to the bar in 1790, and commenced practice in Ballston Center. He was land commissioner to settle disputes of titles to military reservations in Onondaga County, New York in 1797, and in 1800 removed to Albany, New York.

He was elected as a Federalist to the 11th and 12th United States Congresses, holding office from March 4, 1809, to March 3, 1813.

Emott was a member from Dutchess County of the New York State Assembly from 1814 to 1817, and was Speaker in 1814. In 1815, he was the Federalist candidate for U.S. Senator from New York but was defeated by Nathan Sanford.

He was First Judge of the Dutchess County Court from 1817 to 1823, and Judge of the Second Circuit Court from 1827 to 1831.

He was buried at the Poughkeepsie Rural Cemetery.

References

1771 births
1850 deaths
Politicians from Poughkeepsie, New York
Speakers of the New York State Assembly
New York (state) state court judges
Burials at Poughkeepsie Rural Cemetery
Federalist Party members of the United States House of Representatives from New York (state)